State Trunk Highway 37 (often called Highway 37, STH-37 or WIS 37) is a  state highway in Buffalo and Eau Claire counties in the west-central area of the US state of Wisconsin that runs generally north-northeasterly from Alma to Eau Claire. The southern  from Mondovi (the only significant settlement along the course of the highway) to Alma generally follows the course of the Buffalo River.

Route description
WIS 37 closely follows in a south-southwest to north-northeast direction. WIS 37 begins at Wisconsin Highway 35/Great River Road in Alma. It then meanders in the northeast direction, connecting multiple county trunk highways along the way. South of Mondovi, it intersects Wisconsin Highway 88. In Mondovi, it travels briefly eastward, concurrent with U.S. Route 10 before branching off north. Continuing north, it then intersects with Wisconsin Highway 85, meets Interstate 94 at a partial cloverleaf interchange, and then intersects U.S. Route 12 (US 12), at the northern terminus of WIS 37.

History
Since its formation around 1918, WIS 37 did not undergo a significant change. Initially, its northern terminus was in downtown Eau Claire. Since the 1940s, it no longer ended in downtown, but instead at a US 12 bypass.

Major intersections

See also

References

External links

037
Transportation in Buffalo County, Wisconsin
Transportation in Eau Claire County, Wisconsin